A garrison sergeant major (GSM) in the British Army is the senior warrant officer of a garrison and holds the rank of warrant officer class 1. The GSM London District, always a guardsman, holds one of the four most senior WO1 appointments in the British Army, and has military ceremonial responsibility for important state occasions such as Trooping the Colour.

London District
The post of GSM London District was established in the early 1940s with specific responsibilities as State Ceremonial Sergeant Major. The first tasks of the new GSM were to organise the military ceremonial at the funeral of King George VI in 1952 and the coronation of Queen Elizabeth II in 1953. The GSM also organised the military ceremonial at the state funeral of the Queen on 19 September 2022.

The GSM London District traditionally  wore the same badge of rank as a regimental sergeant major of Foot Guards, the large Royal Coat of Arms on the right upper sleeve. However, on 28 April 2011, the day before the wedding of The Duke and Duchess of Cambridge, the Ministry of Defence announced that, in recognition of the work done by garrison sergeant majors on behalf of the Royal Household, Queen Elizabeth II approved the revival of the original insignia worn by sergeant majors appointed to the court of King William IV in the early 19th century. It incorporates the large Royal Coat of Arms worn by selected warrant officers class 1 of the Household Division, placed over four chevrons sewn in gold thread, the traditional badge of the sergeant major, originally worn on both arms of their tunics.

Gallery

Notes

References

External links
Garrison Sergeant Majors Containing more detailed biographies and some video of recent holders of this post.

Military appointments of the British Army
Guards Division (United Kingdom)
Warrant officers